The General was a horse owned by US President John Tyler.  When he died, John Tyler had The General buried on his Sherwood Forest Plantation, in the Sherwood Forest Pet Cemetery.

The horse's epitaph reads:

See also
 List of historical horses

External links
 

Individual warhorses
John Tyler
Burials in Virginia
Individual male horses
United States presidential horses